The 1958 Texas Longhorns football team represented the University of Texas at Austin during the 1958 NCAA University Division football season.

Schedule

References

Texas
Texas Longhorns football seasons
Texas Longhorns football